Krynice  is a village in the administrative district of Gmina Dobrzyniewo Duże, within Białystok County, Podlaskie Voivodeship, in north-eastern Poland.

The village has a population of 320.

The village is the location of the RTCN Białystok (Krynice) mast, the seventh highest structure in Poland.

References

Krynice